Before the Six-Day War and Yom Kippur War, the Golan Heights comprised 312 inhabited areas, including 2 towns, 163 villages, and 108 farms. In 1966, the Syrian population of the Golan Heights was estimated at 147,613. Israel seized about 70% of the Golan Heights in the closing stages of the Six-Day War. Many of these residents fled during the fighting, or were driven out by the Israeli army, and some were evacuated by the Syrian army. A cease-fire line was established and large parts of the region came under Israeli military control, including the town of Quneitra, about 139 villages and 61 farms. Of these, the Census of Population 1967 conducted by the Israeli Defence Forces listed only eight, including Quneitra. One of the remaining populated villages, Shayta, was partially destroyed in 1967 and a military post built in its place. Between 1971–72 it was destroyed completely, with the remaining population forcibly transferred to Mas'ade, another of the populated villages under Israeli control.

The Israeli Head of Surveying and Demolition Supervision for the Golan Heights proposed the demolition of 127 of the unpopulated villages, with about 90 abandoned villages to be demolished shortly after May 15, 1968. The demolitions were carried out by contractors hired for the job. After the demolitions, the lands were given to Israeli settlers. There was an effort to preserve buildings of archaeological significance and buildings useful for the planned Jewish settlements.

After the 1973 Yom Kippur War, parts of the occupied Golan Heights were returned to Syrian control, including Quneitra, which had changed hands several times during the war. According to a United Nations Special Committee, Israeli forces had deliberately destroyed the city before their 1974 withdrawal.

Depopulated and demolished towns and villages

Depopulated villages 
Alphabetical list; all parts of the name are treated equally, including the article (al-, as-, etc.), but the diacritics are disregarded (for example ‘A is treated like a plain A).
Caution: some names appear twice in different orthographic variations, originating from different sources.

Depopulated farms 
Alphabetical list; all parts of the name are treated equally, including the article (al-, as-, etc.), but the diacritics are disregarded (for example ‘A is treated like a plain A).

See also 
 Ethnic cleansing
 Depopulated Palestinian locations in Israel
 List of villages depopulated during the Arab–Israeli conflict
 Population transfer

Footnotes

External links 
 Golan Heights and Vicinity: October 1994 – CIA map of the Golan Heights, at the Library of Congress, showing abandoned/dismantled Syrian villages.
 South Lebanon and Vicinity 1976 – Map from the University of Texas at Austin, showing Syrian villages in the Golan Heights from pre-1967 sources.
 Southern Lebanon Border Area 1986 – Map from the University of Texas at Austin general libraries map collection, showing Syrian villages in the Golan Heights from pre-1967 sources.

Arab–Israeli conflict
Former populated places in Syria
 
Forced migration
Israel–Syria relations
Ethnic cleansing in Asia
Ghost towns in Asia